PBU may refer to:

Patriot Bible University, a fundamentalist Christian correspondence school located in Del Norte, Colorado
Primitive Baptist Universalist, Christian Universalist church based primarily in the central Appalachian region of the United States
Philadelphia Biblical University, an institution of higher learning located in Langhorne, Pennsylvania, now called Cairn University
Pass break up, a gridiron football statistic for passes that are tipped or batted incomplete by the defense without an interception